Lepidonotus is a genus of marine annelids in the family Polynoidae (scale worms).  The genus occurs globally and includes 80 species, usually found in shallow waters down to about 80 metres.

Description
Body dorsoventrally flattened, short, with 26 segments and 12 pairs of elytra on segments 2, 4, 5, 7, 9, 11, 13, 15, 17, 19, 21, and 23. Prostomium with  three antennae; lateral antennae continuous with prostomium, laterally to median antenna. Parapodia with elongate acicular lobes with both acicula penetrating epidermis. Notochaetae slender and densely serrated. Neurochaetae much more stout, with rows of spines distally and  unidentate and/or bidentate tips (see Barnich & Fiege, 2003 for detailed diagnosis)
.

Species 
The following species of Lepidonotus were accepted as valid as of June 2020:

Lepidonotus adspersus (Grube, 1878)
Lepidonotus aeololepis Haswell, 1883
Lepidonotus albopustulatus Horst, 1915
Lepidonotus ambigua Knox, 1960
Lepidonotus angustus Verrill, 1873
Lepidonotus antillarum (Schmarda, 1861)
Lepidonotus arenosus Ehlers, 1901
Lepidonotus austera (Grube, 1878)
Lepidonotus australiensis Seidler, 1924
Lepidonotus australis (Schmarda, 1861)
Lepidonotus banksi Knox, 1951
Lepidonotus bicornis (Uschakov, 1982)
Lepidonotus bowerbanki Baird, 1865
Lepidonotus brasiliensis (Quatrefages, 1866)
Lepidonotus brevicornis Quatrefages, 1865
Lepidonotus brunneus Day, 1975
Lepidonotus caelorus Moore, 1903
Lepidonotus caeruleus Kinberg, 1856
Lepidonotus carinulatus (Grube, 1869)
Lepidonotus citrifrons Augener, 1906
Lepidonotus clava (Montagu, 1808)
Lepidonotus cristatus (Grube, 1876)
Lepidonotus crosslandi Monro, 1928
Lepidonotus cryptocephalus (Grube, 1878)
Lepidonotus dentatus Okuda in Okuda & Yamada, 1954
Lepidonotus durbanensis Day, 1934
Lepidonotus elongatus Marenzeller, 1902
Lepidonotus fiordlandicus Knox, 1956
Lepidonotus furcillatus Ehlers, 1901
Lepidonotus fusicirrus (Schmarda, 1861)
Lepidonotus glaber Imajima, 1997
Lepidonotus glaucus (Peters, 1854)
Lepidonotus hainanicus Uschakov, 1982
Lepidonotus havaicus Kinberg, 1856
Lepidonotus hedleyi Benham, 1915
Lepidonotus helotypus (Grube, 1877)
Lepidonotus hermenioides Amoureux, 1974
Lepidonotus hupferi Augener, 1918
Lepidonotus impatiens (Savigny in Lamarck, 1818)
Lepidonotus jacksoni Kinberg, 1855
Lepidonotus javanicus Horst, 1917
Lepidonotus lacteus (Ehlers, 1887)
Lepidonotus lissolepis Haswell, 1883
Lepidonotus magnatuberculata Seidler, 1923
Lepidonotus malayanus Horst, 1915
Lepidonotus margaritaceus Kinberg, 1856
Lepidonotus melanogrammus Haswell, 1883
Lepidonotus natalensis Day, 1951
Lepidonotus nesophilus Chamberlin, 1919
Lepidonotus oculatus Baird, 1865
Lepidonotus onisciformis Ehlers, 1918
Lepidonotus panamensis Hartman, 1939
Lepidonotus pellucidus Dyster in Johnston, 1865
Lepidonotus permixturus Hanley & Burke, 1991
Lepidonotus polae Wehe, 2006
Lepidonotus polychromus Schmarda, 1861
Lepidonotus purpureus Potts, 1910
Lepidonotus pustulatus Potts, 1910
Lepidonotus rossii Leach in Ross, 1819
Lepidonotus ruber Horst, 1917
Lepidonotus sagamianus (Izuka, 1912)
Lepidonotus savignyi (Grube, 1856)
Lepidonotus scanlandi Hanley & Burke, 1991
Lepidonotus scoticensis Nolte, 1936
Lepidonotus semisculptus Johnston, 1865
Lepidonotus semitectus (Stimpson, 1856)
Lepidonotus simplicipes Haswell, 1883
Lepidonotus spiculus (Treadwell, 1906)
Lepidonotus spinosus Hanley & Burke, 1991
Lepidonotus squamatus (Linnaeus, 1758)
Lepidonotus stellatus Baird, 1865
Lepidonotus stephensoni Monro, 1931
Lepidonotus sublevis Verrill, 1873
Lepidonotus tenuisetosus (Gravier, 1902)
Lepidonotus tomentosus (Grube, 1856)
Lepidonotus torresiensis Haswell, 1883
Lepidonotus vandersandei Horst, 1917
Lepidonotus variabilis Webster, 1879
Lepidonotus wahlbergi Kinberg, 1856
Lepidonotus yorkianus Augener, 1922

References

Phyllodocida
Polychaete genera